is a city located on Awaji Island, Hyōgo Prefecture, Japan.

Geography
The city of Sumoto occupies the middle of Awaji Island, sandwiched between Awaji and Minamiawaji. with the Gulf of Harima on the Seto Inland Sea to the west and Osaka Bay to the east. The Sumoto River flows into Osaka Bay in the center of the city area, part of which are within the borders of the Setonaikai National Park

Surrounding municipalities 
Hyogo Prefecture
 Awaji
 Minamiawaji

Climate
Sumoto has a humid subtropical climate (Köppen climate classification Cfa) with hot summers and cool winters. Precipitation is significant throughout the year, but is somewhat lower in the winter.

Demographics
Per Japanese census data, the population of Sumoto has been declining steadily over the past 60 years.

History
The city of Sumoto is situated in ancient Awaji Province, and developed as a castle town around the Muromachi period Sumoto Castle. It was ruled as part of Tokushima Domain during the Edo period. After the Meiji restoration, it became part of Tsuna District, Hyōgo. The town of Sumoto was established with the creation of the modern municipalities system April 1, 1889. It was raised to city status on February 11, 1940. On February 11, 2006, the town of Goshiki (from Tsuna District) was merged into Sumoto

Government
Sumoto has a mayor-council form of government with a directly elected mayor and a unicameral city council of 18 members. Sumoto contributes one member to the Hyogo Prefectural Assembly. In terms of national politics, the city is part of Hyōgo 9th district of the lower house of the Diet of Japan.

Economy
The local economy is largely rural, and is based on agriculture and commercial fishing. Sumoto has traditionally been famous for its production of Awaji onions, Naruto oranges and Kobe Beef.

Education
Sumoto has 13 public elementary schools and five public middle schools operated by the city government and two public high schools operated by the Hyōgo Prefectural Department of Education. The city also operates one combined elementary/middle school. There are also one private combined middle/high school.

Transportation

Railway 
Sumoto does not have any passenger rail service.

Highways 
  Kobe-Awaji-Naruto Expressway

Other
Jointly with Minami Awaji and Awaji, the city operates a low-cost electric bike rental scheme, designed to attract visitors to stay for more than one day in order to explore the island.

Sister City relations 
  - Kronstadt, Russia
  - Hawaii County, Hawaii, United States
  - Van Wert, Ohio, United States

Local attractions
 Sumoto Castle - A castle ruin, one of the Continued Top 100 Japanese Castles.
 Awajishima Historical Museum
 Yura Fortress
 Wellness Park Goshiki Takataya Kahei Park

Notable people from Sumoto
Mao Daichi, actress
Mao Miyaji, actress

References

External links

 Sumoto City official website 

Cities in Hyōgo Prefecture
Port settlements in Japan
Populated coastal places in Japan
Sumoto, Hyōgo